Exequiel Fernando Figueroa Reyes (1924 – 28 December 2005) was a Chilean basketball player. He competed in the men's tournament at the 1948 Summer Olympics and the 1952 Summer Olympics.

References

External links

1924 births
2005 deaths
Chilean men's basketball players
Olympic basketball players of Chile
Basketball players at the 1948 Summer Olympics
Basketball players at the 1952 Summer Olympics
Sportspeople from Santiago
1950 FIBA World Championship players
20th-century Chilean people